Giano  di Campofregoso may refer to the following members of the Campofregoso family of Genoa:

Giano I di Campofregoso
Giano II di Campofregoso